Melbourne Victory were considered to be one of the future "powerhouse" football clubs in Australia prior to the 2005/06 A-League season, with Socceroos Kevin Muscat and Archie Thompson returning to Melbourne from successful club careers in Europe. It was widely believed that they would be contenders for the A-League championship. However, the team ended up finishing a disappointing seventh and missed out on the finals.

Players

First-team squad

Transfers
In

Matches

2005-06 Hyundai A-League fixtures

Ladder

2005–06 end-of-season awards
Player of the Year (Victory Medal)
Kevin Muscat
Clubman of the Year
Adrian Leijer
Players' Player of the Year
Adrian Leijer
Golden Boot
Archie Thompson
Union Supporters Fans' Player of the Year
Richard Kitzbichler

2005-06
2005–06 A-League season by team